is a Japanese sailor. He competed in the men's 470 event at the 1988 Summer Olympics.

References

External links
 

1962 births
Living people
Japanese male sailors (sport)
Olympic sailors of Japan
Sailors at the 1988 Summer Olympics – 470
Place of birth missing (living people)
Asian Games medalists in sailing
Sailors at the 1990 Asian Games
Medalists at the 1990 Asian Games
Asian Games gold medalists for Japan